Brad Keywell (born October 1969) is an American entrepreneur from Michigan. He is the founder and executive chairman of Uptake Technologies, an industrial AI software provider. He is an early investor of Tempus Labs, co-founder of Groupon, Echo Global Logistics, Mediaocean, DRIVIN, and Lightbank. As of August 2020, his net worth was estimated at US$ 2.7 billion. Keywell is the recipient of the 2019 Ernst & Young World Entrepreneur Of The Year award.

Early life and education 
Keywell grew up in Bloomfield Hills, Michigan, and attended Cranbrook Schools. He studied at the London School of Economics in 1990, received a Bachelor of Business Administration in 1991 from the University of Michigan and a Juris Doctor cum laude in 1993 from the University of Michigan Law School. He is a member of the Michigan Bar Association and the State Bar of Illinois.

Career 
Keywell started his career as an intern for Sam Zell's Equity Group Investments, LLC. In 1999, he and Eric Lefkofsky co-founded Starbelly, an online supply chain management firm, which was acquired in January 2000 by HA-LO (NYSE:HMK) for $240 million. In February 2005, he co-founded Echo Global Logistics. Keywell served as the Chairman of the Board of the company until 2017.

In June 2006, Keywell co-founded MediaBank, a SaaS provider to the advertising and media buying industry. In 2012, a merger between MediaBank and Donovan Data Systems (DDS) created Mediaocean, and in 2014, Vista Equity Partners acquired MediaOcean. In 2007, he co-founded ThePoint.com, an online collective action website. In late 2008, it became a collective buying platform, changed its name to Groupon and got listed on NASDAQ in 2011. Keywell served on the Board of Directors from its inception through 2018.

In February 2010, Keywell co-founded Lightbank, a technology venture and mid-stage investment firm. In 2013, he co-founded DRIVIN, an automobile data analytics company. In 2016, KAR Auction Services (NYSE:KAR) acquired DRIVIN in a $43 million stock deal. In July 2014, Keywell founded the industrial AI software company Uptake valued at over $2.3 billion. In 2015, he became an early investor and director of Tempus, a medical technology company. In September 2018, he founded and launched WNDR Museum, an experiential art museum located in Chicago’s West Loop.

Keywell has been an adjunct professor at the Booth School of Business at the University of Chicago and the author of the book Biz Dev 3.0: Changing Business as We Know It, published by ALM Publishing. He is the host of a podcast, The Upside, and a participant of the Renaissance Weekend and the TED Conference.

Philanthropy 
In 2014, Keywell created the Keywell Foundation to support nonprofit and NGO enterprises. In 2015 he signed The Giving Pledge to give away half of his wealth.

He is the founder and chairman of Chicago Ideas, an innovations and ideas gathering. He is  Chairman of the Future Founders Foundation, providing entrepreneurial education to students in Chicago, and Illinois Innovation Council.

Awards 
Keywell was the Ernst & Young World Entrepreneur of the Year in 2019.

References

External links
 

Living people
1969 births
21st-century American businesspeople
Ross School of Business alumni
University of Michigan Law School alumni
People from Bloomfield Hills, Michigan
American company founders